Robert Marshall Utley (October 31, 1929 – June 7, 2022) was an American author and historian who wrote sixteen books on the history of the American West. He was a chief historian for the National Park Service.

Much of his writing deals with the United States Army in the West, especially in its confrontations with the Indian tribes. He wrote:
the frontier army was a conventional military force trying to control, by conventional military methods, a people that did not behave like conventional enemies and, indeed, quite often were not enemies at all. This is the most difficult of all military assignments, whether in Africa, Asia, or the American West.

The Western History Association annually gives out the Robert M. Utley Book Award for the best book published on the military history of the frontier and western North America.

Early life and education
Utley was born on October 31, 1929 in Bauxite, Arkansas. During his childhood, his parents, Don Williams Utley and Valeria Haney, moved him to northwestern Indiana, where he attended high school. Later, he attended nearby Purdue University, receiving a Bachelor of Science in history. He then attended Indiana University for graduate school, receiving a Master of Arts in history in 1952. Following his graduation, Utley served in the U.S. Army, and then joined the National Park Service.

In 1997 he was awarded the Samuel Eliot Morison Prize for lifetime achievement given by the Society for Military History.

Selected bibliography
(The Lamar Series in Western History). Yale University Press, (2012).Lone Star Lawmen: The Second Century of the Texas Rangers. Oxford University Press, USA (January 30, 2007).Lone Star Justice: The First Century of the Texas Rangers. Oxford University Press, USA (March 22, 2002).Indian Wars. With Wilcomb E. Washburn. Houghton Mifflin Company, New York (2002). Originally published by New York: American Heritage Press, Inc., 1977.A Life Wild and Perilous: Mountain Men and the Paths to the Pacific. Henry Holt & Company (1997).Sitting Bull: The Life and Times of an American Patriot. Henry Holt & Company (1993). Originally published as The Lance and the Shield: The Life and Times of Sitting Bull.
 University of Nebraska Press (1989).Cavalier in Buckskin: George Armstrong Custer and the Western Military Frontier. University of Oklahoma Press (1988).
 High Noon In Lincoln: Violence on the Western Frontier. University of New Mexico Press (1987).The Indian Frontier of the American West, 1846-1890. University of New Mexico Press (1984).Bluecoats and Redskins: The United States Army and the Indian, 1866 - 1891, Cassell (1975).Clash of Cultures: Fort Bowie and the Chiricahua Apaches. National Park Service Washington DC (1977).Frontier Regulars; the United States Army and the Indian, 1866-1891. Macmillan, New York (1973).Frontiersmen in Blue; the United States Army and the Indian, 1848-1865. Macmillan, New York (1967).The Last Days of the Sioux Nation''. Yale University Press, New Haven, CT (1963).

References

External links
An Interview with Robert M. Utley on the History of Historic Preservation in the National Park Service—1947-1980
Robert Utley presented personal stories, at the Friends of the Little Bighorn Battlefield symposium in 2001, about life as a seasonal ranger at then Custer Battlefield National Monument from 1947-1952.
Interview with Robert Utley, board member of Friends of the Little Bighorn Battlefield since 2001, where he brings us forward with his life since the publication of his memoirs, Custer and Me.

 

1929 births
2022 deaths
21st-century American historians
21st-century American male writers
Historians of the American West
Historians of the United States
Purdue University alumni 
Indiana University alumni
People from Bauxite, Arkansas
Military personnel from Arkansas
Writers from Arkansas
American male non-fiction writers